Assulella kuznetsovi is a moth of the family Tortricidae. It is found in Vietnam, India, China (Guangxi, Yunnan) and Sumatra.

References

Moths described in 1983
Eucosmini
Moths of Asia